The 2019 Africa Cup of Nations was an international football tournament that was held in Egypt from 21 June to 19 July 2019. The 24 national teams involved in the tournament were required to register a squad of 23 players, including three goalkeepers. Only players in these squads were eligible to take part in the tournament.

The position and date of birth listed for each player is per the official squad list published by CAF. The age listed for each player is on 21 June 2019, the first day of the tournament. The numbers of caps and goals listed for each player do not include any matches played after the start of tournament. The club listed is the club for which the player last played a competitive match prior to the tournament. The nationality for each club reflects the national association (not the league) to which the club is affiliated. A flag is included for coaches that are of a different nationality than their own national team.

Group A

Egypt
Coach:  Javier Aguirre

Egypt's 25-man preliminary squad was announced on 21 May 2019. The final squad was announced on 11 June. Amr Warda was excluded from the squad for disciplinary reasons on 26 June. However, the Egyptian Football Association recalled him to the national team on 28 June after the player posted an apology video on his official account on Facebook.

DR Congo
Coach: Florent Ibengé

DR Congo's 32-man preliminary squad was announced on 22 May 2019. The final squad was announced on 11 June.

Uganda
Coach:  Sébastien Desabre

Uganda's 29-man preliminary squad was announced on 22 May 2019. The final squad was announced on 11 June.

Zimbabwe
Coach: Sunday Chidzambwa

Zimbabwe's 34-man preliminary squad was announced on 14 May 2019. The final squad was announced on 10 June. Tafadzwa Kutinyu withdrew injured and was replaced by Lawrence Mhlanga on 19 June.

Group B

Nigeria
Coach:  Gernot Rohr

Nigeria's 31-man preliminary squad was announced on 14 May 2019. The final squad was announced on 10 June.

Guinea
Coach:  Paul Put

Guinea's 25-man preliminary squad was announced on 27 May 2019. The final squad was announced on 13 June. Baïssama Sankoh withdrew injured and was replaced by Lass Bangoura on 19 June.

Madagascar
Coach:  Nicolas Dupuis

Madagascar's 26-man preliminary squad was announced on 16 May 2019. The final squad was announced on 12 June.

Burundi
Coach: Olivier Niyungeko

Burundi's 26-man preliminary squad was announced on 14 May 2019. The final squad was announced on 12 June.

Group C

Senegal
Coach: Aliou Cissé

Senegal's 25-man preliminary squad was announced on 31 May 2019. The final squad was announced on 13 June.

Algeria
Coach: Djamel Belmadi

Algeria's final squad was announced on 30 May 2019, with no preliminary squad released prior to it. Haris Belkebla was excluded from the squad for disciplinary reasons and was replaced by Andy Delort on 13 June.

Kenya
Coach:  Sébastien Migné

Kenya's 30-man preliminary squad was announced on 14 May 2019. The final squad was announced on 11 June.

Tanzania
Coach:  Emmanuel Amunike

Tanzania's 39-man preliminary squad was announced on 2 May 2019. The final squad was announced on 13 June.

Group D

Morocco
Coach:  Hervé Renard

A 27-man provisional squad was announced on 27 May 2019. Anas Zniti replaced Abdelali Mhamdi on 5 June due to injury.

The final squad was announced on 11 June 2019. On 19 June 2019, it was announced that Abdelkrim Baadi will officially replace the injured Abderrazak Hamdallah.

Ivory Coast
Coach: Ibrahim Kamara

South Africa
Coach:  Stuart Baxter

A 23-man final squad was announced on 9 June 2019.

Namibia
Coach: Ricardo Mannetti

A 23-man final squad was announced on 10 June 2019.

Group E

Tunisia
Coach:  Alain Giresse

The following players were called up for the 2019 Africa Cup of Nations.

Mali
Coach: Mohamed Magassouba

The final squad was announced on 15 June 2019. Two players named Adama Traoré were selected; to avoid confusion, the older player from US Orléans was widely known as Adama Traoré I and the younger of Cercle Brugge as Adama Traoré II.

Mauritania
Coach:  Corentin Martins

Angola
Coach:  Srđan Vasiljević

A 23-man final squad was announced on 12 June 2019.

Group F

Cameroon
Coach:  Clarence Seedorf

A 34-man provisional squad was announced on 10 May 2019. On 15 May, Jean-Charles Castelletto, Tristan Dingomé, Stève Mvoué were added to the provisional squad. The list was reduced to 29 names on 10 June 2019.

The final squad was announced on 11 June 2019.

Ghana
Coach: James Kwesi Appiah

The final squad was announced on 10 June 2019.

Benin
Coach:  Michel Dussuyer

On 22 May 2019, Benin announced their final 23-man squad.

Guinea-Bissau
Coach: Baciro Candé

Guinea-Bissau's 29-man preliminary squad was announced on 3 June 2019. The final squad was announced on 12 June.

Player representation

Player representation by league system

By club
Clubs with 5 or more players represented are listed.

Player representation by club

By club nationality

By club confederation
Nations in bold are represented by their national teams in the tournament.

By representatives of domestic league

References

External links

2019
Squads